Labyrinth is a game of physical skill consisting of a box with a maze on top with holes, and a steel marble. The object of the game is to try to tilt the playfield to guide the marble to the end of the maze, without letting it fall into any of the holes. Some versions of the game feature a suspended maze surface that rotates on two axles, each of which is controlled by a knob. Small handheld versions of the game are sold, with the box being completely closed with a transparent cover on top.

The game was developed by BRIO in Sweden and first released there in 1946. It was introduced to the United States by BRIO around 1950. Similar games are offered in the US by a number of companies, due to it never being properly copyrighted there (according to one such company).

Reception
Games magazine included Labyrinth in their "Top 100 Games of 1980", describing it as "like walking a tightrope without the element of danger".

See also 
Ball-in-a-maze puzzle
Neverball
Super Monkey Ball
Marble Madness
Marble Blast Gold
GooBall
Perplexus
Lazy Raiders

References 

Games of physical skill
Physical activity and dexterity toys
Single-player games
Tabletop games